Dinsdale may refer to:

Places
Dinsdale, formerly a common name of Low Dinsdale, a village in County Durham, England
Dinsdale railway station, serving Low Dinsdale and Middleton St George
Dinsdale Park, a house and former hotel at Low Dinsdale
Over Dinsdale, a village in North Yorkshire, near Low Dinsdale
Dinsdale, New Zealand, a suburb of Hamilton

People
Dinsdale (surname)
Dinsdale Landen, British actor

Fictional characters
 One of the Piranha Brothers in a sketch from the British comedy programme Monty Python's Flying Circus
A character in the British play The Ruling Class